Aarhus Forestry Botanical Garden is a forestry botanical garden located in the south of Aarhus, Denmark. It forms a small part of the northern section of Marselisborg Forests and is situated right next to Marselisborg Palace and Mindeparken. The botanical garden was established in 1923.

Because of the nearby forest and the varied flora, the botanical garden also attracts a varied fauna and it is not unusual to spot roe deer, squirrels, owls and herons, amongst other animals here.

Gallery

Sources 
 Excursions in The Forestry Botanical Garden Aarhus Municipality (2006) 

Parks in Aarhus
Botanical gardens in Denmark
Forestry in Denmark